Lakshya is an Indian crime television series which was first aired on 25 August 2011 and ended on 17 September 2016. Its sequel has launched from 7 March 2021 on every Sunday named as Nave Lakshya.

Series

Plot

Lakshya (Season 1) 
It is a story of Police team named Unit 8. The team solves a new case and tactfully battles it out with the criminals. The team members shared a common goal to eradicating crime and they will go to any extent to ensure that justice is served.

Nave Lakshya (Season 2) 
It is a story of Police team named Unit 9. It revolves around a competent police team. It will show the police team trying to solve crime cases and several social cases to make the lives of the people in society better. It will focus on how a dedicated team of police shall bring about justice in an area using their skills and resources.

Cast

Lakshya (Season 1) 
 Ashok Samarth as ACP Abhay Kirtikar
 Aditi Sarangdhar as Sub-inspector Saloni Deshmukh
 Shweta Shinde as Inspector Renu
 Pari Telang as Inspector Disha Suryavanshi
 Kamlesh Sawant as Hawaldar Maruti Jagdale
 Jagannath Nivangune as Sub-inspector Virendra Kadam
 Dhanashree Kshirsagar as PSI Parna Desai
 Ramesh Wani as Hawaldar
 Mandar Kulkarni as Hacker Manas
 Sandesh Jadhav as Inspector

Guest 
 Sonam Kapoor

Nave Lakshya (Season 2) 
 Abhijeet Shwetchandra as Vikrant Gaikwad
 Soham Bandekar as Jay Dixit
 Shubhangi Sadavarte as Mokshada Mohite
 Amit Dolawat as Arjun Karandikar
 Uday Sabnis as Appa Malwankar
 Bhushan Telang as Sub-inspector
 Aditi Sarangdhar as Inspector Saloni Deshmukh
 Shweta Shinde as Inspector Renuka Rathore

Production

Season 1 
 ACP Abhay Kirtikar played by well-known actor Ashok Samarth who also starred in Singham. Aditi Sarangdhar comeback to television as Sub-inspector Saloni Deshmukh and Jagannath Nivangune was seen as Sub-inspector Virendra Kadam. Kamlesh Sawant and Mandar Kulkarni was essay constable Maruti Jagdale and ethical hacker Manas respectively. Shweta Shinde and Dhanashree Kshirsagar were selected to play the role of Inspector Renu and PSI Parna Desai respectively.

Season 2 
 Soham Bandekar son of Aadesh Bandekar and Suchitra Bandekar debutante with the role of Police inspector Jay Dixit. Shubhangi Sadavarte playing the role of Police inspector Mokshada Mohite.

Mahaepisode (2 hours) 
 15 August 2021
 13 March 2022
 24 July 2022

References

External links 
 
 
 Lakshya at Disney+ Hotstar
 Nave Lakshya at Disney+ Hotstar

Marathi-language television shows
Indian action television series
Indian crime television series
Detective television series
Police procedural television series
Fictional portrayals of police departments in India
2016 Indian television series endings
Star Pravah original programming
2021 Indian television series debuts
2011 Indian television series debuts
2022 Indian television series endings